Richard Paul Hinds (born 22 August 1980 in Sheffield, South Yorkshire) is an English footballer who most recently played as a defender for Llandudno in the Welsh Premier League.
He is now a primary school teacher.

Playing career
Hinds started his career at the academy of Tranmere Rovers before being promoted to the senior squad where he made a name for himself as a consistent and reliable performer.

After 51 appearances, in July 2003 he signed for Hull City in League Two. Having initially signed a one-year deal with the club, an impressive start to his Tigers career saw him, in October 2003, sign an extension to his deal which would keep him at the KC Stadium until the end of the 2004/05 season. He helped the club win promotion to League One and in all made 48 appearances for the Tigers and scoring once against Macclesfield Town.

In March 2005 he joined Scunthorpe United on loan.

In May 2005 he was released by Hull City and was signed on a Bosman transfer only two months in his spell.

In July 2007, Hinds transferred to his boyhood club Sheffield Wednesday after rejecting a contract from his former club Scunthorpe United and agreeing to sign on a two-year deal with the Owls. His first goal came as he headed home the winner in a 2–1 victory against Blackpool at Hillsborough on 27 October 2007.

In only the second game of the 2008–09 season, a 1–4 defeat away at Wolverhampton Wanderers, Hinds suffered a severe fracture of his left leg. The injury looked like keeping him out for the majority of the remaining season but he returned in late February and once again became a regular member of the squad and in mid-march began claiming his place in the centre of the Owls defence at the expense of Mark Beevers. Hinds remained a firm fan favourite at Sheffield Wednesday, as he became one of the shining lights of the team and a rock at the centre of the defence. However, in the 2009–10 season he failed to hold down a place in the squad.

On 10 May 2011, Hinds was released from his contract by Sheffield Wednesday along with teammate Tommy Miller.
On 4 November 2011, Richard Hinds signed with Conference side Lincoln City until the end of the year.

On 2 February 2012, Hinds signed for League One side Yeovil Town on a contract until the end of April 2012 as cover for suspended captain Paul Huntington. He made his debut against former club Sheffield Wednesday, and scored his first Yeovil goal in a 3–1 win over Rochdale. With Hinds short-term contract finishing at the end of April he missed the club's final match of the season but agreed a new one-year deal in late May. On 14 August 2012, Hinds scored two of Yeovil's goals in a 3–0 win over Colchester United in the Football League Cup. He then scored again the following Saturday in League One, against Coventry City, in a 1–1 draw. Hinds was an unused substitute in the 2013 League One play-off final against Brentford on 19 May 2013, as Yeovil won promotion to the Championship for the first time in the club's history. Hinds was released by the Yeovil at the end of the season having not been offered a new contract.

On 18 July 2013, Bury signed Hinds on a one-year contract after a successful trial. Hinds scored his first goal for Bury in the 1st round of the Football League Cup against Crewe Alexandra. Bury went on to win the match 3–2. He scored his first league goal for the club in a 3–0 win over Hartlepool United. Hinds was released at the end of the 2013–14 season by Bury.

Hinds joined Cymru Alliance side Llandudno on 22 August 2014 in a player/ assistant manager capacity.

Outside football
In 2011, Hinds attained a first-class honours degree in Law from the Open University, believing that "footballers should plan for life after football while they are still playing".

Career statistics

A.  The "Other" column constitutes appearances and goals (including those as a substitute) in the Football League Trophy and Play-off matches.

References

External links

1980 births
Living people
Footballers from Sheffield
English footballers
Association football defenders
Association football utility players
English Football League players
National League (English football) players
Tranmere Rovers F.C. players
Hull City A.F.C. players
Scunthorpe United F.C. players
Sheffield Wednesday F.C. players
Lincoln City F.C. players
Yeovil Town F.C. players
Bury F.C. players
Llandudno F.C. players